ATSI may refer to:

Atsi, another name for the Zaiwa language of China and Burma 
Aboriginal and Torres Strait Islander people, the first peoples of Australia. The ATSI abbreviation is often considered disrespectful.
Ahtna Technical Services Incorporated a subsidiary of Ahtna, Incorporated
NLR Air Transport Safety Institute
Anatomy Trains Structural Integration, a school related to Rolfing